"Minnesota" is a song by American rapper Lil Yachty. It was originally released on November 2015 from his Summer Songs EP, before being re-released on March 9, 2016 as a remix featuring American rappers Quavo, Skippa da Flippa and Young Thug as the second single from Yachty's debut mixtape, Lil Boat.

Background and release
"Minnesota" was originally released in November 2015, and was on his debut EP titled Summer Songs EP. The original version of "Minnesota" was 2:05 long and only included vocals from Lil Yachty. The song was then remixed by rappers, Quavo, Skippa Da Flippa and Young Thug and was included on his debut mixtape Lil Boat.

Music video
The music video for "Minnesota", directed by Brendan Vaughan and RJ Sanchez, premiered on November 18, 2016, via Yachty's Vevo channel. Young Thug's verse is omitted in the video.

Remixes
On July 8, 2016, rapper and singer PnB Rock released his remix of the song titled "Allaska" via his SoundCloud. On December 31, 2016, rapper Allan Kingdom released his remix of the song via SoundCloud.

Charts

Certifications

References

External links

2016 singles
2016 songs
Lil Yachty songs
Young Thug songs
Songs written by Young Thug
Quavo songs
Songs written by Quavo
Songs written by Lil Yachty
Songs about Minnesota
Capitol Records singles
Motown singles